The 2015 McNeese State Cowboys football team represented McNeese State University in the 2015 NCAA Division I FCS football season. The Cowboys were led by tenth-year head coach Matt Viator and played their home games at Cowboy Stadium. They were a member of the Southland Conference. They finished the season 10–1, 9–0 in Southland play to win the Southland Conference title. They went undefeated 10–0 in the regular season. They received the Southland's automatic bid to the FCS Playoffs where they lost in the second round to fellow Southland member Sam Houston State.

Previous season
The Cowboys finished the 2014 season with a 6–5 overall record and were 4–4 in conference play.  They were ranked in both FCS polls from the preseason polls through the twelfth week.  Their highest ranking was Number 5 in the Sports Network poll and Number 4 in the Coaches poll in weeks four through six.  The Cowboys dropped out of both polls following a season ending loss to the Lamar Cardinals.

Schedule

The game between LSU and McNeese State was canceled due to inclement weather.  The game was delayed due to lightning after 5 minutes of play during each team held the ball for one drive and no one scored. Both schools' athletic directors decided not to reschedule the game, thus declaring it a "no contest". LSU did agree to pay McNeese State its promised fee of $500,000.
Schedule Source:

Game summaries

@ LSU

Sources:

Incarnate Word

Sources:

@ Stephen F. Austin

Sources:

Mississippi College

Sources:

@ Nicholls

Sources:

Southeastern Louisiana

Sources:

@ Central Arkansas

Sources:

Northwestern State (Homecoming)

Sources:

@ Abilene Christian

Sources:

Sam Houston State

Sources:

@ Lamar

Sources:

FCS Playoffs

Second Round–Sam Houston State

Sources:

Ranking movements

References

McNeese State
McNeese Cowboys football seasons
Southland Conference football champion seasons
McNeese State
McNeese State Cowboys football